Brckovljani is a village and a municipality in Zagreb County, Croatia.

According to the 2001 Croatian census, there are 6,837 inhabitants, in the following settlements:

 Božjakovina – 178
 Brckovljani – 1,542
 Gornja Greda – 625
 Gornje Dvorišće – 66
 Gračec – 1,127
 Hrebinec – 242
 Kusanovec – 49
 Lupoglav – 1,086
 Prečec – 220
 Prikraj – 603
 Stančić – 687
 Štakorovec – 315
 Tedrovec – 97

98.54% of the population are Croats.

References

External links 

 

Municipalities of Croatia
Populated places in Zagreb County